LeRoy Pope Walker (February 7, 1817 – August 23, 1884) was the first Confederate States Secretary of War.

Early life and career
Walker was born near Huntsville, Alabama in 1817, the son of John Williams Walker and Matilda Pope, and a grandson of LeRoy Pope. He was educated by private tutors, then attended universities in Alabama and Virginia. Before reaching the age of 21, he was admitted to the bar. He married Eliza Dickson Pickett on July 29, 1850. He held various offices in Alabama; in 1853, he resigned his position as a circuit court judge in order to focus on his legal practice. He actively promoted secession.

Civil War

Largely on the advice of several of Walker's supporters, including his brother Richard, President Jefferson Davis appointed him to the post of Secretary of War, though Walker was not personally known to Davis. He was energetic and confident in support of the Confederacy, but had no military training. The stress and difficulties of his cabinet position seriously affected his health. In March 1861, the Southern states that had seceded from the Union appointed special commissioners to travel to those other Southern states that had yet to secede. Walker was chosen as the commissioner from Alabama to the Tennessee Secession Convention, where he publicly read Alabama's Articles of Secession and tried to persuade Tennessee politicians to vote to do likewise.

In April 1861, shortly after the Civil War began with the bombardment of Fort Sumter by rebel forces, Walker predicted that Washington, D.C. and Boston would fall to the Confederacy before May 1 of that year. However, this never happened.

Starting in August 1861, Davis encouraged Walker to become a Confederate representative to Europe; Walker did not accept this, but on September 16 he resigned his post. Davis made him a brigadier general in the Confederate States Army, and he commanded the army garrisons in Mobile and Montgomery, Alabama, before resigning in March 1862. He returned to the army in April 1864 to serve as a military judge.

Post-war
After the war, Walker returned to his legal practice and continued to be interested in politics. He died in 1884 and was buried in Maple Hill Cemetery in Huntsville.

See also

List of American Civil War generals (Confederate)

Notes

References

 
 
 
 

1817 births
1884 deaths
Alabama state court judges
American Presbyterians
Confederate States Army brigadier generals
Executive members of the Cabinet of the Confederate States of America
19th-century American politicians
Democratic Party members of the Alabama House of Representatives
Politicians from Huntsville, Alabama
People of Alabama in the American Civil War
Walker family
Military personnel from Huntsville, Alabama
Lawyers from Huntsville, Alabama
19th-century American judges
19th-century American lawyers